Benjamin Andrew Davey Manenti (born 23 March 1997) is an Australian cricketer. He made his Twenty20 debut for the Sydney Sixers in the 2018–19 Big Bash League season on 29 December 2018. On debut he took two wickets for thirteen runs and was named the player of the match.

Through his Italian grandmother, Manenti is eligible to represent Italy internationally. He committed to playing at the 2020–21 ICC Men's T20 World Cup Europe Qualifier in Spain in May 2020, but the event was postponed due to the COVID-19 pandemic. He made his List A debut on 1 November 2021, for Tasmania in the 2021–22 Marsh One-Day Cup. He made his first-class debut on 15 March 2022, for Tasmania in the 2021–22 Sheffield Shield season.

Personal life
His father John Manenti was a rugby union player and now coach who won the 2014 premiership as coach of Eastwood Rugby Club and played 150 games at prop and hooker with Western Suburbs and Sydney University Football Club. He is also now the coach of the Australia women's national rugby sevens team.

References

External links
 

1997 births
Living people
Australian cricketers
Sydney Sixers cricketers
Tasmania cricketers
Cricketers from Sydney